Rodrigo Patricio Ruiz de Barbieri (born 10 May 1972) is a former Chilean professional footballer and current manager of Los Cabos United.

Club career
He played for Unión Española, Regional Atacama, Toros Neza, Santos Laguna, Pachuca, Veracruz, and last played for Estudiantes Tecos of the Ascenso MX.

International career
During the qualifiers to the 1998 FIFA World Cup, Ruiz played a match with the Chile national team against Uruguay at Centenario Stadium, that Chile lost 1–0. In total, he made 7 appearances for Chile and scored one goal.

Coaching career
He began his career with Tecos in 2015. After working in Lobos Zacatepec and Irritilas FC, he joined Los Cabos United in 2022.

Personal life
He was nicknamed Pony by his former fellow footballer in Unión Española, Mario Lucca, due to his strength and height.

He naturalized Mexican by residence.

One of the 33 miners rescued from the 2010 mining accident in Copiapó, Chile, Mario Gómez, is related to him since Gómez is the cousin of his mother-in-law.

References

External links
 
 

1972 births
Living people
Chilean footballers
Chilean expatriate footballers
Chile international footballers
Chilean emigrants to Mexico
Naturalized citizens of Mexico
Mexican footballers
Unión Española footballers
Regional Atacama footballers
Club Puebla players
Toros Neza footballers
Santos Laguna footballers
C.F. Pachuca players
Tecos F.C. footballers
C.D. Veracruz footballers
Chilean Primera División players
Primera B de Chile players
Liga MX players
Ascenso MX players
Chilean expatriate sportspeople in Mexico
Expatriate footballers in Mexico
Association football midfielders
Chilean football managers
Chilean expatriate football managers
Tecos F.C. managers
Expatriate football managers in Mexico